Daland may refer to:

People
 Jesper Daland (born 2000), Norwegian football player
 Morten Daland, Norwegian handball player
 Peter Daland (1921–2014), American swimming coach

Places
 Daland, Iran

Other
 Huff-Daland, American aircraft manufacturer